A chromate ester is a chemical structure that contains a chromium atom (symbol Cr) in a +6 oxidation state that is connected via an oxygen (O) linkage to a carbon (C) atom. The Cr itself is in its chromate form, with several oxygens attached, and the Cr–O–C attachment makes this chemical group structurally similar to other ester functional groups. They can be synthesized from various chromium(VI) metal compounds, such as CrO3, chromium chloride complexes, and aqueous chromate ions, and tend to react via redox reactions to liberate chromium(IV).

Chromate esters are the key reactive intermediates in the Jones oxidation, the mechanistically related oxidations using pyridinium dichromate or pyridinium chlorochromate. Chromate esters of allyl alcohols may isomerize via formal [3,3]-sigmatropic shift to give rearranged enone products.

An example of an isolable chromate ester is ((CH3)3CO)2CrO2.

References 

Chromates
Esters